is a passenger railway station in the town of Minakami, Gunma, Japan, operated by the East Japan Railway Company (JR East).

Lines
Minakami Station is served by the Jōetsu Line. Seasonal Minakami limited express and Rapid services operate to and from Ueno Station in Tokyo.

Station layout
The station consists of one side platform and one island platform, serving a total of three tracks, connected by a footbridge. The station is staffed.

Platforms

History

The station opened on 30 October 1928. Upon the privatization of the Japanese National Railways (JNR) on 1 April 1987, it came under the control of JR East.

Passenger statistics
In fiscal 2017, the station was used by an average of 341 passengers daily (boarding passengers only).

Surrounding area
 Minakami Onsen
Minakami Post Office

See also
 List of railway stations in Japan

References

External links

 Minakami Station information 

Railway stations in Gunma Prefecture
Railway stations in Japan opened in 1928
Stations of East Japan Railway Company
Jōetsu Line
Minakami, Gunma